Tamien is a neighborhood of central San Jose, California. The neighborhood is centered around Tamien Station, one of San Jose's most important transit stations.

History
The neighborhood and its station are named after the Tamien people of the Ohlone nation, the indigenous inhabitants of San Jose and the Santa Clara Valley.

Geography
Tamien is immediately south of Washington-Guadalupe. The Guadalupe Freeway (CA-87) cuts through the neighborhood. 

Since the onset of the California housing crisis, the neighborhood has been earmarked by city and transit authorities for a mixed-used transit-oriented development around Tamien Station.

Transportation
Tamien is one of the best served neighborhoods in San Jose in terms of transportation.

Tamien station is served by:
 VTA light rail, on the Blue Line (VTA)
 Caltrain (Local, Limited, & Caltrain Baby Bullet)

Parks and plazas
Tamien Park

References

External links

Valley Transit Authority - Tamien Station Transit-Oriented Development

Neighborhoods in San Jose, California